Lac de Crotel is a lake at Groslée in the Ain department, France.

External links
   

Crotel